Batwing is a steel flying roller coaster built by Vekoma at Six Flags America in Prince George's County, Maryland. This is nearly identical to Nighthawk at Carowinds, however that ride has a slightly different ending, and different paint scheme. The ride is also a clone of the now-defunct Firehawk at Kings Island.

Of the two operating Vekoma Flying Dutchmans, Batwing is the only one still operating under its original name at its original park, since Nighthawk originally operated at California's Great America as Stealth. Batwing operates alongside the standard schedule of Six Flags America.

History
In February 2001, it was confirmed that Six Flags America would be receiving Batwing. This attraction would be a Vekoma Flying Dutchman coaster themed to Batman. It would be built towards the back of the park in the Gotham City section. Although the ride was set to open in May 2001, the opening was delayed. On June 16, 2001, Batwing officially opened to guests. It was the first flying roller coaster on the East Coast.

Ride experience

Track

Batwing has a total of five inversions. It features one vertical loop, two inline twists, two "Lie to Fly" and two "Fly to Lie" elements. Each "Lie to Fly" and "Fly to Lie" element is counted as a half inversion. A "Lie to Fly" element is when riders are on their backs, facing the sky and they are flipped and face the ground. A "Fly to Lie" element is the opposite.

Layout
Once riders are seated and restrained, the train tilts backwards into a 'lay-down' position and dispatches. The train travels backwards out of the station, turns left and travels up the  lift hill at a 33 degree angle. Once the train reaches the top of the lift hill, it dips down into a twist (called a "Lie-to-Fly") that turns the trains upside down into a flying position where riders face the ground. Riders then go through an over banked Horseshoe Curve element. Following the Horseshoe, the train enters a "Fly-to-Lie" element that turns riders back to a lay-down position. The train then goes into another "Lie-to-Fly" element. Following the loop, riders go through another turn and then hit two consecutive inline twists. Following the inline twists, the train enters the final helix. After the helix, riders hit the final "Fly-to-Lie" element and the train is slowed down on the brake run.

Trains
Batwing currently operates with two trains. Each train has six cars that have four seats in a single row for a total of 24 riders. It originally operated with three trains but was reduced to two in 2007. Riders are secured by a vest over the chest and a lap bar.

See also 
 Nighthawk (roller coaster) - a similar ride located at Carowinds

References

External links 
 Batwing at Six Flags America website

Roller coasters operated by Six Flags
Six Flags America
Roller coasters in Maryland
Roller coasters introduced in 2001
Batman in amusement parks
Warner Bros. Global Brands and Experiences attractions